Queen Modjadji, or the Rain Queen, is the hereditary queen of Balobedu, a people of the Limpopo Province of South Africa. The Rain Queen is believed to have special powers, including the ability to control the clouds and rainfall.

 Modjadji Royal council have a new King. The traditional installation of Prince Lekukela Modjadji as the king of the Balobedu took place at Khetlhakoni Royal Palace in Modjadjiskloof outside Tzaneen in Limpopo. 
Princess Masalanabo who was expected to be the next Rain Queen will take a position reserved for her to be Khadikholo (great aunt) of Balobedu Nation.

History

There are several different stories relating to the creation and history of the Rain Queens of Balobedu. One story states that an old chief in 16th century Monomotapa (South eastern Zimbabwe), was told by his ancestors that by impregnating his daughter, Dzugundini, she would gain rain-making skills. Another story involves a scandal in the same chief's house, in which the chief's son impregnated Dzugundini. Dzugundini was held responsible and was forced to flee the village. Dzugundini ended up in Molototsi Valley, which is in the present day Balobedu Kingdom.

The village she established with her loyal followers was ruled by a Mokoto, a male leader, but the peace and harmony of the village was disrupted by rivalries between different families; therefore, to pacify the land, Mokoto impregnated his own daughter in order to restore the tribe's matrilineal tradition. In another version, Mokoto had a vision that he had to marry his daughter in order to create a matrilineal dynasty. She gave birth to the first Rain Queen, known as Modjadji, which means: "ruler of the day".

Oral histories recount that the Rain Queens are originally from ancient Ethiopia and built the fortress of Great Zimbabwe.

During the 1930s, social anthropologists Eileen Krige and Jack Krig carried out fieldwork on the society of the Rain Queens. Their work was published in 1943 as The Realm of a Rain-Queen. A Study of the Pattern of Lovedu Society, and remains one of the standard anthropological works.

Customs
According to custom, the Rain Queen must shun public functions, and can only communicate with her people through her male or female councillors.

Every November she presides over the annual Rainmaking ceremony at her royal compound in Khetlhakone Village.

She is not supposed to marry, but has many "wives", as they are referred to in the Balobedu language. These are not spouses in the usual sense of the word; as a queen regnant, she has the equivalent of royal court servants, or ladies-in-waiting), sent from many villages all over the Balobedu Kingdom. These wives were selected by The Queen's Royal Council and in general are from the households of the subject chiefs. This ritual of "bride giving" is strictly a form of diplomacy to ensure loyalty to the Queen.

The Rain Queen's mystical rain-making powers are believed to be reflected in the lush garden which surrounds her royal compound. Surrounded by parched land, her garden contains the world's largest cycad trees which are in abundance under a spectacular rain belt.  One species of cycad, the Modjadji cycad, is named after the Rain Queen. The rain-making powers are also believed to be transmitted through matriarchal mitochondrial DNA. Therefore,  the Queenship is inherited through matrilineal lineage, by the daughters of the Rain queen.

The Rain Queen is a prominent figure in South Africa, many communities respecting her position and, historically, attempting to avoid conflict in deference thereto. The fifth Rain Queen, Mokope Modjadji, maintained cordial relations with Nelson Mandela. Even presidents of South Africa during apartheid visited the Rain Queens.

The Rain Queen has become a figure of interest, she and the royal institution becoming a significant tourist attraction contributing to the South African economy. The Rain Queen was offered an annual government civil list. The stipend was also expected to help defray the costs of preserving the cycad trees found in the Rain Queen's gardens.

Makobo Modjadji

Rain Queen Makobo Constance Modjadji VI (1978 – 12 June 2005) was the sixth in a line of the Balobedu people's Rain Queens. Makobo was crowned on 16 April 2003, at the age of 25, after the death of her predecessor and grandmother, Queen Mokope Modjadji. This made her the youngest queen in the history of the Balobedu.

Makobo was admitted into the Limpopo Medi-Clinic for an undisclosed illness on 10 June 2005 and died two days later, at the age of 27. The official cause of death was listed as chronic meningitis. She is survived by a son, Prince Lekukela Hex (b. 1997), and a daughter, Princess Masalanabo (b. February 2005).

Succession
The Rain Queen's official mates are chosen by the Royal Council, so that all of her children will be of dynastic status, from which future Rain Queens may descend. However, the Rain Queens are not expected to remain in exclusive relations with these partners. In the past, the Rain Queen was allowed to have children only by her close relatives.

Perhaps uniquely, the Balobedu crown descends according to matrilineal primogeniture: her eldest daughter is always her successor, so the title of Rain Queen is normally passed from mother to daughter. It is said that she ingests poison when she is near death so that her daughter will assume the crown more quickly. Lately, however, many traditions have been abandoned, influenced by Christian missionaries.

The government of South Africa recognized Princess Masalanabo as the future Rain Queen in a 2016 memorandum and she was expected to officially receive her certificate in 2021, when she turned 18, as minors are not allowed to be traditional leaders. Makobo's brother Prince Mpapatla was designated regent for Princess Masalanabo. However, Mpapatla himself has a daughter by his cousin, a woman from the royal Modjadji line. Mpapatla, however, has insisted that his late sister's daughter, Princess Masalanabo, will be enthroned as the queen when she turns 18.

However, in May 2021, the Modjadji Royal Council appointed Masalanabo's older brother, Prince Lekukela, as king of the Balobedu nation with the support of Prince Regent Mpapatla, citing Masalanabo's lack of preparation on divine processes traditionally assumed by Rain Queens, as she lives in Gauteng with the family of Mathole Motshekga, a former advisor to the Balobedu Royal Council. Mpapatla claims there is a 2006 Royal Council resolution appointing Lekukela as heir to the Balobedu throne, which was allegedly kept secret due to security concerns. The Royal Council plans for Princess Masalanabo to instead assume the position of khadi-kholo (great aunt) of the Balobedu kingdom. Lekukela was installed as King elect by the Modjadji royal council in October 2022, although his coronation is still pending judicial approval after a court application was submitted by Princess Masalanabo's legal team in order to challenge the Royal Council's decision, which they claim to be illegal under the Traditional Leadership and Governance Framework Act and to ignore the recognition of Masalanabo as Rain Queen by President Cyril Ramaphosa. An online petition against Lekukela's appointment was launched in May 2021, even though the Royal Council has stated the decision is irreversible.

A male branch of the extended royal clan has also petitioned the South African president to restore the male line of the Balobedu royal house, which reigned before 1800. This request is considered unlikely to be granted, since the Rain Queen heritage is recognised as a national cultural legacy and interest in it has stimulated significant tourist trade. This male branch is reportedly considered by some to be a faction that promotes division within the royal clan of the Balobedu people.

List of Rain Queens
 Rain Queen I Maselekwane Modjadji (1800–1854)
 Rain Queen II Masalanabo I Modjadji (1854–1894)
 Rain Queen III Khesetoane Modjadji (1895–1959)
 Rain Queen IV Makoma Modjadji (1959–1980)
 Rain Queen V Mokope Modjadji (1981–2001)
 Rain Queen VI Makobo Modjadji (2003–2005)
 Prince Regent Mpapada Modjadji (2007-2022)
 King Lekukela Modjadji VII (2022 -)

In popular culture

The second Rain Queen, Masalanabo Modjadji is said to have been the inspiration for H. Rider Haggard's novel She: A History of Adventure.

The Marvel comics character Storm is a fictional descendant of the dynasty that produces the Rain Queens through the line of the Sorceress Supreme Ayesha from the Hyborian Age. Mujaji is also the name of the goddess of sustenance in The Orisha, the pantheon of Wakanda. In Wakanda, Storm is called Hadari-Yao ("Walker of Clouds" in ancient Alkamite), a goddess who preserves the balance of natural things.

See also
Balobedu
Matrilineality
Matrilineal succession
Rainmaking (ritual)
She (novel)
The Mysterious Flame of Queen Loana

References

External links
Rain Queen customs and history, from a South African website for the Ikageng Community Empowerment of Tzaneen
Rain Queen customs, from a commercial website promoting "very small-scale, locally produced, low-impact Ecotours"
"The Balobedu of Modjadji".
Rain Queens of Africa and other Female Leadership traditions
The Sacred Forest of the Department
The Lobedu: A North Sotho Tribe

Limpopo
 
Royal titles
Monarchies of South Africa